Muhammad Safiee bin Ahmad (born 29 April 1997) is a Malaysian professional footballer who plays for Malaysia Super League side PDRM as a midfielder.

References

External links
 

1997 births
Living people
Malaysian footballers
PDRM FA players
Malaysia Super League players
Association football midfielders